"Running with the Boys" is a song recorded by Canadian electropop artist Lights for her third studio album, Little Machines (2014). It was co-written by Lights and the album's producer, Drew Pearson. The song was first released September 9, 2014 as the album's second countdown single through iTunes, and was later serviced to Canadian radio on January 26, 2015 as the second official single.

Composition
"Running with the Boys" is a new wave-inspired song with a duration of four minutes and twelve seconds. Its instrumentation features prominent percussion beats, and additionally consists of synthesizers, guitars, and bass. The song's nostalgic lyrics express a feeling of freedom and "being a kid again," according to Lights.

Music video
The video for "Running with the Boys" was directed by Amit Dabrai and was shot in Stouffville, Ontario. It premiered via MuchMusic on January 26, 2015 and was added to her Vevo account on January 30. Featuring the singer's real-life friends (Ryan Cain, Ashley Poitevin and Raina Douris), the video follows a group of young women through a day of reenacting typical childhood activities.

Chart performance

Credits and personnel
Credits adapted from Little Machines liner notes.

Lights — vocals, synths, guitar, bass, drum programming, writing
Drew Pearson — additional synths, guitar, bass, drum programming, production, engineering, writing
Maurie Kaufmann — drums

Spike Stent — mixing
Pherbie Midgely, Blake Mares — engineering (assistant)
João Carvalho — mastering

Release history

References

2014 songs
2015 singles
Lights (musician) songs
Warner Records singles
Songs written by Drew Pearson (songwriter)
Songs written by Lights (musician)